Kartalinskaya Zapan (Kärtäle Zapane) is a rural locality (a village) in Ishlinsky Selsoviet, Beloretsky District, Bashkortostan, Russia. The population was 17 as of 2010. There are 5 streets.

Geography 
Kartalinskaya Zapan is located 53 km west of Beloretsk (the district's administrative centre) by road. Tikhy Klyuch is the nearest rural locality.

References 

Rural localities in Beloretsky District